is a 2015 action role-playing game developed by FromSoftware and published by Sony Computer Entertainment for the PlayStation 4. Bloodborne follows the player's character, a Hunter, through the decrepit Gothic, Victorian-era–inspired city of Yharnam, whose inhabitants are afflicted with a blood-borne disease which transforms the residents, called Yharnamites, into horrific beasts. Attempting to find the source of the plague, the player's character unravels the city's mysteries while fighting beasts and cosmic beings.

The game is played from a third-person perspective. Players control a customizable protagonist, and the gameplay is focused on strategic weapons-based combat and exploration. Players battle varied enemies while using items such as trick weapons and firearms, exploring different locations, interacting with non-player characters, and unravelling the city's mysteries. Bloodborne began development in 2012 under the working title of Project Beast. Bearing many similarities to FromSoftware's Dark Souls series, Bloodborne was inspired by the literary works of authors H. P. Lovecraft and Bram Stoker and the architectural design of real-world locations in countries such as Romania, the Czech Republic and Scotland.

Bloodborne was released in March 2015 and received critical acclaim, with praise directed at its gameplay, particularly its high difficulty level, atmosphere, sound design, Lovecraftian themes, and interconnected world design. Some criticism was directed at its technical performance at launch, which was improved with post-release updates. An expansion adding additional content, The Old Hunters, was released in November 2015. By the end of 2015, the game had sold over two million copies worldwide. Bloodborne won several awards and has been cited as a masterpiece, and is considered to be one of the greatest video games ever made. Some related media and adaptations have also been released, including a card game, board game and comic book series.

Gameplay 

Bloodborne is an action role-playing game played from a third-person perspective and features elements similar to those found in the Dark Souls series, also made by FromSoftware. The player makes their way through different locations within the decrepit Gothic world of Yharnam while battling varied enemies, including bosses, collecting different types of items that have many uses, interacting with non-player characters, opening up shortcuts, and continuing through the main story.

At the beginning of the game, the player creates their character, the Hunter. The player determines the basic details of the Hunter; gender, hairstyle, name, skin colour, body shape, voice, and eye colour are some of the options the player can customize. The player also chooses a starting class, known as an "Origin", which provides a basic backstory for the Hunter and sets the player's starting attributes. The origins, while describing the player character's past, do not have any effect on gameplay beyond altering starting stats. Another way the player defines their Hunter is by choosing what brotherhood they are a member of. These religious societies, known as "Covenants", each have their views on the world of Yharnam.

The player can return to  the safe zone, known as the "Hunter's Dream", by interacting with lanterns spread throughout the world of Yharnam. Doing so replenishes health, but respawns all enemies in the game world, with the exception of bosses and mini-bosses. Lanterns also serve as the game's checkpoints; the player will return to the last activated lantern when they die. Positioned separate from Yharnam, the Hunter's Dream delivers some of the game's basic features to the player. Players may purchase helpful items, such as weapons, clothing and consumables, from the Messengers using Blood Echoes or Insight, level up their character by talking to the Doll, or upgrade their weapons in the workshop, among other things. Unlike Yharnam and all other locations in the game, the Hunter's Dream is considered completely safe as it is the only location in the game not to feature enemies. However, the last two boss battles of the game take place in the Hunter's Dream, although both are optional to the player.

Bloodborne world of Yharnam is an extensive map full of interconnected areas. Some areas of Yharnam are not connected to the main locations and require the player to teleport there via the gravestones in the Hunter's Dream. The player may be presented with multiple options when progressing through locations, but usually, there is the main path that the player uses to progress through the story. When traversing the main path, the player will encounter diverging paths that lead to entirely different locations that are optional. Each path eventually leads back to the central area the player started in; this provides the player with shortcuts, useful for when they die or need to backtrack.

Combat 
Combat is fast-paced and requires an offensive approach in order for the player to combat dense hordes of enemies. The player character is agile and can dodge attacks by strafing around enemies while locked on. The new risk-and-reward style of gameplay is emphasized through Bloodborne Rally system, which allows the player to recover portions of lost health by striking an enemy within a small window of time after taking damage. Director Hidetaka Miyazaki explained that this represents the player's increased will to continue after successfully striking an enemy. A New Game Plus mode is also present; after the player has finished the game, a new game will immediately be started. New Game Plus is optional. The player retains all their equipment (barring a few items such as keys) and the game is more challenging than the previous playthrough.

The player may only wield two melee weapons in the right hand and two secondary weapons in the left hand at one time. Most melee weapons, called Trick Weapons, can transform into an alternate state; each state encourages a different approach to combat. With most Trick Weapons, one state is usually a slower, larger weapon that deals heavier damage per hit, while the other state is smaller, faster, and deals its damage in hit streaks. Certain weapons are wielded in both hands after transforming, meaning the left hand secondary weapon cannot be used. For example, the Hunter Axe in its initial state is wielded with one hand and can be used to dispatch enemies in cramped areas quickly; when transformed into its secondary state, it becomes an extended two-handed weapon more suited for crowd control. The player's main secondary weapon is a firearm; the firearm, usually a pistol, can be used in a traditional sense, as well as a way to stun enemies. When an enemy is stunned, the player can perform a Visceral attack; Visceral attacks cause a large amount of damage in one hit and can also be performed after the player strikes an enemy from behind with a charged attack. Other secondary weapons include torches, cannons, and shields, while other main melee weapons include a hammers, swords, two-handed gun-spears or swords, which serve as melee and ranged weapons, a whip, a scythe, and a wheel. The player can carry other offensive weapons, such as Molotov cocktails, throwing knives, and pebbles.

Similarly to the Dark Souls games, slaying enemies grants the player "Blood Echoes," which double as the player's experience points and currency. Should the player die, their Blood Echoes will be lost at the location of their death. If they can reach that point again, they can regain them. However, should the player die before retrieving their lost Blood Echoes, they will be lost forever. Sometimes, the player's Blood Echoes may be captured by an enemy, typically identified by glowing blue eyes; defeating this enemy will return the lost Blood Echoes. If an enemy does not hold the Blood Echoes, they will be on the ground near the location of the player's death. Insight is a secondary form of currency; it can be spent to purchase items, and depending on the player's Insight level, the world will change in many different ways. When the player reaches a specific Insight level, some NPCs or enemies might no longer be present, the sky and moon may change colour, the player may start hearing different sounds (such as a crying baby and mysterious whispering), or enemies' attack patterns may change. The world also changes as the player progresses through the main story. Insight can be gained by finding and defeating bosses, using items that grant Insight, helping another player via co-op defeat a boss, and successfully defeating another player in competitive multiplayer.

When enemies are defeated, they drop useful items for the player, such as Blood Vials, which heal the player, or Quicksilver Bullets, the main ammunition for ranged weaponry. The player can also sacrifice health to create Blood Bullets for their ranged weaponry. The blood bullets have no functional difference from the consumable quicksilver bullets, other than the fact that they function as extra ammo, and the Rally system still applies to the lost health. The player may find useful items hidden in the environment as well as being dropped by enemies. The items hidden in the environment usually require the player to go on a different path than they were initially travelling. Other items the player may find include various forms of Coldblood, which grant the player Blood Echoes when consumed, Antidotes, used to cure poisoning, and Hunter Badges, which allow the player to purchase more items in the Hunter's Dream. The player's weapons can also be upgraded or modified by equipping certain items such as Blood Gems.

Multiplayer 
Multiplayer mode is present in Bloodborne, though it functions differently from its counterparts in the Dark Souls series. By activating a non-consumable item at the cost of one Insight point, players can summon other players into their world to help with enemies and bosses, and progress through areas of the game cooperatively. This leaves players vulnerable to invasions; another player may invade the victim's game world and attempt to kill them unless the player can find and defeat a specific enemy known as a Chime Maiden before an enemy player invades. Multiplayer summoning is limited by proximity; players can only be summoned within a specific distance of each other to prevent players from being summoned too far away to be of any assistance. Players can only summon players around the same level as them to prevent the game from being too difficult or too easy for one of the players. Using a password, however, gets around many of the restrictions of summoning a friend. Depending on what covenant the player and summoned player are a part of, they will have the opportunity to be hostile towards one another. Players can summon an NPC to help them in addition to getting help from other players. The NPC serves as an AI companion to the player that helps defeat enemies. Players can only summon specific NPCs that they have met throughout their journey. Another way players may interact with each other is by leaving notes. A player may leave a tip for defeating a boss, tell the reader where to go, fool the reader by purposely providing incorrect information, or leave a meaningless message to others. Players may rate a message as 'Fine' or 'Foul', indicating whether the note is helpful or malicious to future readers. When a player rates a message as 'Fine', the player who wrote the note will have their health restored.

Chalice Dungeons 
Chalice Dungeons are specialized dungeons that become available to the player through use of special items and materials. Each dungeon can be generated as a fixed version with preset layouts, items, and enemies as well as a "root" version that randomly generates novel configurations of the dungeon through procedural generation. The dungeons vary in depth and difficulty and are formed by performing a ritual with a Chalice and other materials in the Hunter's Dream. Chalice Dungeons are optional and provide additional content to the player. Gameplay is much the same as the main story in that it contains various areas and enemies that the player must overcome to complete the Dungeon. Each Chalice Dungeon contains multiple bosses that the player must defeat to progress through the Dungeon's levels, some of which are fought in the main world, others which are unique to the Chalice Dungeons. Special types of lootable chests not found in the main story are hidden throughout the Dungeons, providing the player with the materials to generate more Dungeons. One major difference between the main story and the Chalice Dungeons is the world design. In the main world of Yharnam, the design is open-ended, more spacious, and is a mixture of indoor and outdoor environments. Chalice Dungeons are only indoors, cramped, and contain many traits of a typical dungeon. The branching paths featured in the main story are still present in the Chalice Dungeons. Another important difference is the objectives. In the main story, players journey through many different locations with many different objectives. In the Chalice Dungeons, the player's primary objective is to locate a door, then find the lever to open the door, which is located elsewhere, and then battle the boss behind the door. After the boss is defeated, the player enters the next area, which will be completely different, and completes the same goal. The cycle repeats at least three times before the entire Chalice Dungeon is cleared. Chalice Dungeons, like the main story, can be played alone or cooperatively with other players.

Synopsis

Setting

Bloodborne takes place in Yharnam, a decrepit Gothic city known for its medical advances around the practice of blood ministration. Over the years, many travellers journey to the city seeking the remedy to cure their afflictions; the player's character journeys to Yharnam seeking the cure, something known as Paleblood, for an unspecified illness. However, upon arriving in the city, it is discovered that Yharnam is plagued with an endemic illness that has transformed most of its citizens into bestial creatures. The player must navigate the streets of Yharnam during the night of The Hunt and overcome its violently deranged inhabitants and horrifying monsters to stop the source of the plague and escape the Nightmare. Long ago, the residents of Yharnam began worshipping ancient, eldritch cosmic beings known as the Great Ones after scholars from the College of Byrgenwerth discovered something referred to as a "medium" in the ruins of an ancient, highly advanced civilization, on top of which Yharnam was built. The Great Ones provided the healing blood Yharnam was famous for, which is also the source of the plague.

Plot 
The player character, a Hunter, is being operated on by an old man, who explains that he is performing a blood transfusion to allow them to sign a "contract", mentioning a mysterious condition referred to as Paleblood. He warns the Hunter that they will go on a strange journey that may seem like a bad dream. The Hunter blacks out and awakens. A large, flesh-torn beast rises from the floor and menaces them. A sudden fire forces the beast's retreat, and then little creatures ("Messengers") crawl over the Hunter as they black out again. After the player completes character creation, the Hunter awakens on an operating table in a different clinic in a place called Yharnam.

The Hunter finds their first lantern, which when lit transports them to a spectral realm called the Hunter's Dream, where they encounter Gehrman, an elderly wheelchair-using man who provides advice, and the Doll, a living doll who assists the player in leveling up. Gehrman explains that to obtain the blood they seek and escape the dream, they must hunt down the beasts raging through Yharnam and halt the source of the plague.

While traveling Central Yharnam, the Hunter is told to seek out the Healing Church because of its connection to blood ministration, which is linked to the plague. The Hunter encounters Father Gascoigne, who seeks to kill them to prevent them from transforming into a beast, but becomes a monster himself. The Hunter moves through to the Cathedral Ward and enters the Grand Cathedral, where they encounter Vicar Amelia, now a massive beast. The Hunter comes into contact with an artifact, the skull of a beast, that bids them to visit Byrgenwerth, only accessible through the Forbidden Woods. Arriving at Byrgenwerth after defeating the Shadows of Yharnam, the Hunter slays Rom, a cosmic kin.

With Rom's death, the Hunter gains access to a higher degree of perception and sees Queen Yharnam, an ancient being from the dead civilization who supposedly bore Mergo, the source of the Nightmare. With their new perception, the Hunter can venture to the previously hidden village of Yahar'gul, where the now-visible Great Ones reside to be researched and worshipped by the School of Mensis. The scholars sought to build a vessel for a Great One, known as The One Reborn. After defeating it, the player accesses the spectral realm called the Nightmare of Mensis, where they discover the insane head of the scholars, Micolash. After killing him, the player encounters Mergo and their guardian.

After slaying Mergo's Wet Nurse and letting Mergo die, the game's final phase is initiated. When the Hunter returns to the Hunter's Dream, Gehrman offers to return them to the waking world in the morning. At this point, three different endings are possible, depending on the player's actions. Choosing to accept Gehrman's offer results in the Yharnam Sunrise ending: Gehrman uses his scythe to behead the Hunter, who awakens in Yharnam as the sun rises. In the Hunter's Dream, the Doll bids the Hunter farewell and prays that they live happily, having escaped the Nightmare. Declining Gehrman's offer unlocks one of two endings. The second ending, Honoring Wishes, is the default ending for this case. To prevent the Hunter from being trapped in the dream, Gehrman battles them. After Gehrman is defeated, a Great One known as the Moon Presence arrives and embraces the Hunter, binding them to the Hunter's Dream. The Doll is seen pushing the Hunter, now sitting in Gehrman's wheelchair, remarking that a new Hunt will begin, signifying that the Hunter has taken Gehrman's place as the caretaker of the Dream. Throughout the game, the player can find umbilical cords formed as the result of Great Ones trying to reproduce with humans as a surrogate. If the player consumes three Third Umbilical Cords before refusing Gehrman's offer, the Childhood's Beginning ending is unlocked. After Gehrman is defeated and the Moon Presence appears, the Hunter resists and fights it. Upon defeating the Moon Presence, the Hunter is transformed into an infant Great One and is taken by the Doll.

The Old Hunters 
After discovering an item called "Eye of a Blood-Drunk Hunter", the player learns of the Hunter's Nightmare, where Hunters are cursed to wander, drunk with blood. While travelling through Yharnam, the player is pulled into the Hunter's Nightmare, populated by both beasts and long-crazed Hunters, by a lesser Amygdala. The player can meet Simon the Harrowed Hunter, who tells them that the Nightmare serves as a prison for hunters who have succumbed to madness and the scourge. Simon can assist the player throughout their travels. The player first visits the Nightmare Church, where they encounter and kill the first Church Hunter, Ludwig the Holy Blade, now a horse-like beast known as Ludwig the Accursed. After the battle, the player can either tell the dying Ludwig what has become of the Church and Yharnam or let him die believing that Yharnam has defeated the curse. The player can also kill the founder of the Healing Church, Laurence the First Vicar, after finding him on an altar in the Nightmare version of the grand cathedral, now transformed into a burning Cleric Beast.

The player continues to the Research Hall, where Simon reveals that to find the secret of the Nightmare, the player must reach the Astral Clocktower and kill Lady Maria, another of the first hunters and one of Gehrman's students. After fighting their way through the Research Hall, the hunter encounters and kills the Living Failures who reside in the Lumenwood garden in front of Maria's clocktower. Upon defeating Maria, the player reveals the secret she was protecting: the ruins of a fishing hamlet that had been pulled into the Nightmare, and its inhabitants transformed into grotesque fishlike monsters. While exploring the village, the player can come across a mortally wounded Simon, who then gives the player a key and his weapon, and pleads for the player to end the Nightmare. The player discovers that the hamlet is the origin of the Nightmare—the result of a curse placed on the Byrgenwerth scholars and their Hunter subordinates, who tortured and massacred the hamlet's inhabitants in their quest for knowledge.

As the player continues through the hamlet, they eventually discover the beached corpse of Kos, a Great One from the sea. An infant Great One and source of the Nightmare, the Orphan of Kos, emerges from the corpse's womb and attacks the player out of blind terror. After its defeat, the creature's phantom retreats to its dead mother's side and, upon being laid to rest, the Hunter's Nightmare ends.

Development 

Development of Bloodborne began as development was being completed on the Prepare to Die edition of Dark Souls, released in August 2012. Sony Computer Entertainment approached FromSoftware concerning cooperative development on a title, and director Hidetaka Miyazaki asked about the possibility of developing a game for eighth-generation consoles. The concept of Bloodborne developed from there. There were no connections to FromSoftware's previous titles, even though Miyazaki conceded that it "carries the DNA of Demon's Souls and its very specific level design". Development ran parallel to that of Dark Souls II.

The game's Victorian Gothic setting was partly inspired by the novel Dracula, and the architecture of locations in Romania and the Czech Republic. Miyazaki also enjoyed H. P. Lovecraft's Cthulhu Mythos series of surreal horror stories, and applied similar themes into the game. Miyazaki had wanted to create a game set in such an era as those novels, but he wanted everything to be as detailed as possible, and felt that such a game was only possible on eighth generation hardware. This need for high-end hardware, and the fact that the PlayStation 4 was presented to the company first, was the reason the game was a PS4 exclusive, rather than a cross-generation release. The developers' target frame rate for the title was 30 frames per second, due to their design choices made for the title.

Story details were more plentiful than in the Dark Souls games, though the team created a larger mystery at the heart of the story to compensate for this. The method through which the story is shown and developed to the player is also done in a similar style to Miyazaki's other games, especially the Souls series, in that the plot is revealed with item descriptions, interactions with various NPCs, visual storytelling, and from the player's own inferences and interpretation of the plot. The team did not want to raise the difficulty level higher than their previous games as they felt it would make the game "pretty much unplayable for anyone". To balance this out, the team created a more aggressive combat system focusing on both action and strategy. They also wanted to alter the penalties for death used in the Souls games as they did not want the game to be classified as being for hardcore gamers. One of the more difficult decisions the team faced was the introduction of guns as weapons. Because it would fit well into the game's setting, and that it would consequently be less accurate than modern models, guns were eventually included, taking the place of shields from the previous Souls titles.

Bloodbornes soundtrack was composed by a mix of Japanese and Western composers. The soundtrack contains over 80 minutes of original music by Tsukasa Saitoh, Yuka Kitamura, Nobuyoshi Suzuki, Ryan Amon, Cris Velasco and Michael Wandmacher and features performances by a 65-piece orchestra and a 32-member choir. The development of the soundtrack lasted for around two and a half years.

Screenshots and a gameplay trailer of the game were leaked on the Internet weeks before the official reveal, under the title of Project Beast. Many believed at the time that the leak could be connected to Demon's Souls. However, Miyazaki later stated that Bloodborne was never considered to be Demon's Souls II, due to Sony Computer Entertainment wanting a new intellectual property (IP) for the PlayStation 4.

Release 
Bloodborne was announced at E3 2014, where a trailer was shown. In January 2015, Bloodborne became Game Informer readers' most anticipated game of 2015. The game was originally planned to be released on February 6, 2015, but was delayed to March 24, 2015, in North America, March 25, 2015, in Europe, Australia and New Zealand, March 26, 2015, in Japan, and March 27, 2015, in the United Kingdom and Ireland. A downloadable content expansion, The Old Hunters, was released on November 24, 2015. It takes place within a world where hunters of the past are trapped, and features new weapons, outfits, and items.

A limited collector's edition was launched with the game. It includes a SteelBook case, a hard cover art book, and a digital copy of the game's soundtrack. The soundtrack was released separately on April 21, 2015. The European exclusive Nightmare Edition included physical items such as a quill and ink set, as well as all the items in the collector's edition. An Asian edition includes a letter opener modeled off of the in-game weapon, the Kirkhammer. A PlayStation 4 bundle is also available in Asian regions. A song to promote Bloodborne was recorded by the Hit House featuring Ruby Friedman for a trailer and TV spot of the game, titled "Hunt You Down", written by Scott Miller and William Hunt, and recorded by Wyn Davis in Los Angeles and at Word of Mouth Recording Studios in New Orleans.

Sony Denmark teamed up with Danish organization GivBlod in order to encourage blood donations through a program where donators who donated on March 23, 2015, would receive a chance to win Bloodborne as a gift. An officially licensed card game, based on the game's Chalice Dungeons, was published by CoolMiniOrNot and released in November 2016. In February 2018, a tie-in comic book series written by Ales Kot and published by Titan Comics was released. It ran for four volumes, with each volume being a standalone story. A fifth volume launched in July 2022, written by Cullen Bunn.

Reception 

Bloodborne received "universal acclaim" from critics, according to review aggregator Metacritic. Daniel Tack of Game Informer praised the game's unsettling atmosphere and the aesthetic visuals, which he stated "had brought horror to life". He also praised its challenging gameplay, which he compared to the Dark Souls series, as well as its intimately-realized story, high replay value, deliberate, rewarding and fast-paced combat, sparse storytelling and satisfying weapon customization. He was also impressed by the well-crafted boss battles, unique enemy-design, and soundtrack. He also praised the multiplayer for extending the longevity of the game, and the game for allowing players to learn and adapt throughout a playthrough. He summarized the review by saying that "While this new IP doesn't stray far from the established Souls franchise, it is a magical, wondrous work that admirably instills both terror and triumph in those brave enough to delve into it."

Edge wrote that it was a "dazzling work of dark, abject horror that cements Miyazaki as one of the all-time greats." Electronic Gaming Monthly wrote "Though built on the same core as the Souls games, Bloodborne marks the largest departure from the status quo to date. The numerous changes, many in service of a faster and more aggressive playstyle, might not be for everyone, but if you embrace that shift, you might well have a new favorite in the From Software canon." Kevin VanOrd of GameSpot praised its Lovecraftian horror-themed storyline, energetic boss battles, precise combat for making encounters with enemies fun, as well as its unique artistry and varied environments. He also praised the sound-design of the enemies, the difficulty, which he compared to Dark Souls II, and the melee-based weapons featured in the game for allowing transformation during battle. Regarding the survival horror portion of the game, he stated that it succeeded in making players feel disturbed. The interconnected design of the game world is also praised for making discovery rewarding. Writing for GamesRadar, Ben Griffin praised the game's detailed environments, Gothic-styled visuals, rich combat, fresh challenges, the randomized Chalice Dungeons for extending the game's length and the rewarding character upgrade system. He also praised the game for delivering a sense of progression and offering players motivation to finish the game, as well as the narrative for "intertwining with geography of Yharnam". However, he criticized the game's non-divergent class system, as well as the specialization, as he stated that "lack of magic, miracles, pyromancy, archery, heavy, medium, and light options discourages experimentation." He also criticized the game for always forcing players to upgrade and stock weapons only in certain sections of the game.

Destructoids Chris Carter called it "the most stable Souls game to date", he praised the game's emphasis on melee combat and raw skill, as well as the game's interesting NPCs, sidequests and interactions. He criticized the game's less-inspiring setting and environment design, limited competitive multiplayer, low replay value, as well as the occasional blocked area in the game, which he stated "feel less sprawling and less replayable" than previous FromSoftware games. He summarized the review by saying that "Bloodborne is an interesting mix of everything FromSoftware has learned throughout its storied developmental career. FromSoftware is still one of the only developers left that makes you work for your satisfaction, and Bloodborne is damn satisfying." IGNs Brandin Tyrrel wrote that Bloodborne was "an amazing, exacting, and exhausting pilgrimage through a gorgeous land that imposes the feeling of approaching the bottom of a descent into madness. Though extended load times and minor frame-rate hitches have an effect on the pacing, it's otherwise an intensely challenging and rewarding game. There's an incredible power to unlocking its mysteries, and in succeeding, despite its demand for a pound of your flesh."

Game Revolutions Nick Tan was more critical than most but still quite positive, criticizing the restrictive builds and the unreliable firearms. He also noted that the game suffered from lock-on and camera issues. He summarized the review by saying that "Though not as refined and freeform as some of its predecessors, it continues in the longstanding Souls tradition of lending credence to challenging games and making the seemingly Sisphyean task of conquering ruthless, malformed monstrosities possible and downright commendable." Michael McWhertor of Polygon thought that the story was "intriguing", saying the guns were unlike any other he had used in another game, in that the Visceral attacks give the player "one of the best feelings in any game", praised the game's difficulty for providing satisfying encounters, and thought the cryptic mysteries did a good job at encouraging the player to progress through the game. He also praised the game's environments, enemies, and weapons, as he thought they were well designed and offered the player freedom and variety. McWhertor's main criticisms were concerning the load times and technical issues. He found that the game performed noticeably worse when playing with another player, saying that the frame rate "takes a hit". He also found some mechanics and items confusing, and disliked the fact that there are many loading screens in quick succession. New York Daily News stated that it was "the perfect marriage, blending mechanics that seem easy to learn with gameplay and challenge that demands mastery and ingenuity." The Guardian also gave it a full five-star rating, stating that "elegance, precision, humour, and challenge make Bloodborne irresistible." The Telegraph wrote that it was the "digital edition of a round-the-world trip to foreign continents, each turning of a corner providing equal helpings of excitement and trepidation". At launch, one of the more criticized points of the game was its long loading times, which were later mitigated some via post-release patches.

Sales 
The game sold 152,567 physical retail copies within the first week of release in Japan, ranking first place within the Japanese software sales charts for that particular week. Bloodborne debuted at number two in the UK software retail chart, behind Battlefield Hardline by 22,500 units. In North America, Bloodborne was the second best selling software in March, despite being released at the end of the month. By April 2015, the game had sold over one million copies, and by September 2015, the game had over two million copies sold. Soon after release, Sony stated that the game's sales exceeded their expectations.

Awards 
Bloodborne was awarded the 2015 Game of the Year by several video game review sites, including GameTrailers, Eurogamer, Destructoid, and Edge, along with being awarded the "2015 PlayStation 4 Game of the Year" by IGN. In 2015, Edge rated it the fourth greatest video game of all time.

Notes

References

External links 
 

2015 video games
Action role-playing video games
Dark fantasy role-playing video games
FromSoftware games
Horror video games
Cooperative video games
Video games about death
Dark fantasy video games
Fiction about diseases and disorders
Gothic video games
2010s horror video games
Japanese role-playing video games
Multiplayer and single-player video games
PlayStation 4 games
PlayStation 4-only games
Sony Interactive Entertainment games
Soulslike video games
Video games about diseases
Video games about dreams
Video games about viral outbreaks
Video games adapted into comics
Video games developed in Japan
Video games directed by Hidetaka Miyazaki
Video games featuring protagonists of selectable gender
Video games scored by Cris Velasco
Video games using Havok
Video games with alternate endings
Video games with customizable avatars
British Academy Games Award for Game Design winners